Street Dance Girls Fighter is a spin-off of South Korean dance survival program Street Woman Fighter that premiered on Mnet on November 30, 2021 and aired every Tuesday at 22:20 KST. Female dance crews composed of high school-aged girls compete to become the top teenage dance crew. The winning crew receives a 10,000,000 ₩ scholarship, an opportunity to serve as an advertising model for financial services for teens, and the Street Dance Girls Fighter Trophy.

Cast 
The program is presented by Kang Daniel 
and the teenage dance crews are led by Crew Masters consisting of the participating dance crews and contestants from Street Woman Fighter. 

*Bold - Leader

*[name]/[name] - both of these masters were present for their teams interchangeably

K-Pop Choreography Mission (Episode 5) 
 Hwang Sanghoon (SM Performance Director; Representative for aespa)
 Monsta X (Hyungwon, Joohoney, I.M)
 NCT (Taeyong, Mark)
 Kwon Twins (YGX Dancers; Representative for Mino)
 Itzy (Ryujin, Chaeryeong)
 iKon

Final Mission (Episode 6) 
 Itzy (Ryujin, Chaeryeong)
 Mamamoo (Solar, Moonbyul)
 Kwon Eun-bi
 Lee Dae-hwi (AB6IX)
 Baek Ji-heon (fromis 9)

Missions

Mission 1: Entry Test

 Each crew dances in front of the Crew Masters.
 During the last 10 seconds of each performance, the Crew Masters must click their IN Button if they think the crew matches their standards.
 If a crew gains at least 4 IN buttons, they will pass the entry test. If they have approval from all the crews, they will receive an “ALL IN”
 Crews are given the chance to join the teams of Crew Masters that voted them IN, and be mentored by the Crew Masters.
 If a crew receives less than 4 IN buttons, they will be eliminated on the spot.

Key

Mission 2: Improvised Battle Mission

 Master Crews with more than 2 teenage dance crews (HOOK, LACHICA, PRODWMON & YGX) will need to organise a battle among their own crews in order to select only 2 crews to move on to the next round.
 Master Crews with 1 or 0 teenage dance crews (CocaNButter, WAYB & WANT) will fill their teams by selecting from the crews eliminated by the those with more than 2 crews.
 Master Crews with only 2 teenage dance crews (HolyBang) are automatically filled and move on to the next round. 
 Teenage dance crews not selected by any Master Crews are eliminated

Part 1 : HolyBang 
As only two crews selected HolyBang as their mentors, the team is pre-set and does not have to advance to a selection battle.

Part 2 : HOOK 

 In the first round, each crew is given 30 minutes to choreograph a routine that must incorporate the use of their own shoes as a prop. 
 The crew with the best performance gets chosen to join Hook, while the two runner-up crews have to battle one another in a dance-off. 
 The winner of the dance-off gets chosen to join Hook, while the rest are eliminated

Part 3 : LACHICA 

 The first battle is a dance cypher battle where songs play at random and a single member of any crew is given 40 seconds to freestyle to the particular song. Only 1 member representing their crew can step out at each time and no interference by other members can occur.
 The crew with the best performance in the first battle is selected, while the two runner-up crews participate in a second battle where each crew sends out a representative to participate in a dance-off. Each representative is given 40 seconds to freestyle dance to the song played at random.
 The winner of the dance-off is selected and the remaining crews are eliminated.

Part 4 : PROWDMON 

 The first battle is a dance cypher battle, where songs are played at random for 5 to 7 minutes. Each crew sends out a member to dance for as long as possible and the representative that impresses the most gets selected.
 The second battle is a 1-on-1 battle against PROWDMON's member Lip J, and the winning representative with the best performance is selected.
 The remaining crews are eliminated.

Part 5 : YGX 

 The first and only battle is a freestyle battle, where songs are played at random and each representative of the crew is given 40 seconds to freestyle dance. Only 1 member representing their crew can step out at each time and no interference by other members can occur. After 40 seconds, the song changes and the next representative steps out to dance. 
 The two representatives who impressed the most are selected along with their crews, and the remaining crews are eliminated.

Part 6 : CocaNButter 

 Of the 13 eliminated teams, two teams are selected by CocaNButter to participate in a dance cypher battle, where songs are played at random for 5 minutes and all members of each crew must take turns to step out and dance in that time.
 The crew that impresses the most is selected to join CocaNButter.

Part 7 : WAYB 

 Of the 12 eliminated teams, 2 teams are selected by WAYB to participate in a dance-off which includes 2 rounds.
 In the first round, the leaders of each crew are given 40 seconds each to freestyle to a song played at random.
 In the second round, each crew can send out any member as a representative to freestyle to a song played at random.
 The crew that impresses the most is selected to join WAYB.

Part 8 : WANT 

 Of the 11 eliminated teams, 3 teams are selected by WANT to participate in a dance-off where each crew can send out two members as a representative to freestyle to a song played.
 Each crew are given 60 seconds each to freestyle to a song played.
 The 2 crews that impresses the most are selected to join WANT.

Final Results

Mission 3: One Team Performance Mission

Before the mission the Remaining 16 crews will be ranked from the Best, Good, Middle, Low.
The Master's Crew Team will Work Together to make one performance
There will be Three-Part, The First and Second Part Will Be Deliberately Discuss on Which team will do the Part the Third and Last part is the Joint Part where one Crew choreography from each team will choose to performed all together
They Will Record their Performance with masks for anonymity and fair voting.
The Voting based on YouTube Likes (X 100) + YouTube Views of the Video Within 24 Hours since the Video Released
The Voting will count as 70% of the Overall Score, The 30% of the Score is based on the Master's Score, Were the Masters (Not their own) Will Judge each team.
 The Overall Best Voting Score will Receive 700 Points while the Overall Best Judges Score Will Receive 300 Points thus the perfect score is 1000 Points
 The 4 Master's Crew Team with the Highest Overall Performance Score will be saved to the Next Round
 The 4 Master's Crew Team with the Lowest Overall Performance Score will go to the elimination battle (Similar to Street Woman Fighter)

1 Likes and views are counted from November 16, 2021 16:00~November 20, 2021 23:59 KST and are only counted through Mnet TV's official YouTube channel.

As the 4 lowest master's crew team, CocaNButter, WAYB, WANT, and LACHICA were chosen as candidates for elimination battle.

 The first round is a crew battle and rounds 2 are 1 VS 1
 In the 1 VS 1 rounds, each side dances for 40 seconds separately then 40 seconds together
 At the end, the master's crew team determine the winner

Mission 4: K-pop Choreography Mission

 Each Crew Will Make a Choreography for a K-Pop B-Side Song
 The Winning Crew Team Will Choose Which Crew They Want To Battle With (However they cannot choose the crew from the same team)
 If there are Two Crews in Each Team (YGX, HOOK, HolyBang & PROWDMON). The One Crew Team (LACHICA, WayB, WANT & Coca N Butter) Will Choose Which Crew is the Overall Best.
 There Will Be Two Verse of the song, Each Verse Will Be Performed by Either Crew.
 There will be a Switch Part, Similar to Street Woman Fighter they must teach the Switch Part to Each Group they Competing
 The Winning Team Will Be Chosen by The Rest of the Crew (Not the Crew They in) and a Special Guest, They Will Choose which crew who performed the best
 The Crew Who Receive 4 or More Choose will be Passed to the Finale.
 The Other Crew Who Receive 3 or Less Will Be Eliminated.

Mission 5 : Final Mission

Part 1 : Dance Challenge Mission
Each crew will create a performance and recorded their Key moves on TikTok as a Dance Challenge, the more people do the Challenge, the more Score they earned.

Part 2 : Performance Song Mission
Two crew will team up with an artist and create a performance for their song.

Part 3 : One Team Performance Mission
Each crew will create a performance that shows their true self and teamwork skill as one team.

Final ranking

Viewership

Notes

References

External links 
 

2021 South Korean television series debuts
Dance competition television shows
Korean-language television shows
Mnet (TV channel) original programming